The Art of Keeping Cool is a children's historical novel by Janet Taylor Lisle published in October 2000 by Anthem Books.

Background
Author Janet Taylor Lisle drew from three sources of inspiration when writing The Art of Keeping Cool. Her fascination with her father's service as a bomber pilot in the Royal Air Force, the U.S. army occupation of her home town during World War II, and the far-reaching cultural impact of the Nazi regime.

Summary

The Art of Keeping Cool deals with the difficulties of childhood during World War II. in 1942, making sense of his family is especially difficult for thirteen-year-old Robert, whose father has been deployed in Europe with the Royal Canadian Air Force for more than six months. After Pearl Harbor, Robert and his family moved from their farm in Ohio to live with his father's parents in Rhode Island.

This living situation is strange to Robert, who has never met his grandparents or his cousin Elliot who also lives in Rhode Island. He finds it even more odd that neither his mother or his extended family ever discuss his father. Robert must search to find reason for the unexplainable family dynamic. With the help of Elliot and an exiled German painter named Abel Hoffman, Robert uncovers with the dark history of his father's family.

After a little time Elliot starts going to Abel Hoffman's house to sketch.

Awards
Scott O'Dell Award for Historical Fiction, winner, 2001
Riverbank Review Book of Distinction, winner, 2001
ALA Notable Children's Book
Horn Book Fanfare
Junior Library Guild Selection
Scholastic Book Club Selection

Notes
References:

External links
 Jane Taylor Lisle's Web Site

2000 American novels
2000 children's books
Children's historical novels
American children's novels
Novels set during World War II
Novels set in Rhode Island
Fiction set in 1942